The 2011–12 Mid-American Conference men's basketball season began with practices in October 2011, followed by the start of the 2011–12 NCAA Division I men's basketball season in November. Conference play began in January 2012 and concluded in March 2012. Akron won the regular season title with a conference record of 13–3 over second place Buffalo. Third-seeded Ohio defeated Akron in the MAC tournament final and represented the MAC in the NCAA tournament where they defeated Michigan and South Florida then lost in the Sweet Sixteen to top-seeded North Carolina in overtime.

Preseason awards
The preseason poll and league awards were announced by the league office on October 28, 2015.

Preseason men's basketball poll
(First place votes in parenthesis)

East Division
 Kent State 132 (16)
 Akron 104 (8)
 Ohio 94
  80
 Buffalo 62
 Bowling Green 32

West Division
  128 (14)
 Ball State 111 (9)
  92 (1)
 Toledo 76
  59
 Eastern Michigan 38

Tournament champs
Kent State (12), Akron (6), Ball State (3), Western Michigan (2), Central Michigan (1)

Honors

Postseason

Mid–American tournament

NCAA tournament

Postseason awards

Coach of the Year: Rob Murphy, Eastern Michigan
Player of the Year: Mitchell Watt, Buffalo
Freshman of the Year: Julius Brown, Toledo
Defensive Player of the Year:  Zeke Marshall, Akron
Sixth Man of the Year: Quincy Diggs, Akron

Honors

See also
2011–12 Mid-American Conference women's basketball season

References